Robert Edward Eberly (July 14, 1918 – May 19, 2004), son of Orville and Ruth Eberly, served as Chairman of the Board of Eberly Natural Gas Company, an oil and natural gas exploration and production firm. He was also a director of Gallatin National Bank (retiring in 1990). Eberly graduated in 1939 from Penn State with a BS in Commercial Chemistry.

On March 17, 1990, the College of Science at Penn State was renamed the Eberly College of Science in recognition of the support of the Eberly family.  The Eberly family has also made donations to help build the Paterno Library addition and the Bryce Jordan Center at University Park campus, endow scholarships for Penn State Fayette Campus students and support higher education at Penn State and West Virginia University. Robert Eberly's sister, Carolyn Eberly Blaney and her husband W. Gerald Blaney, serve as trustees of the Eberly Family Trust, as did Eberly's sister Margaret Eberly George (d. 2000). His wife, Elouise R. (née Ross), is an honorary alumna of Penn State.

See also
Hobby-Eberly Telescope

References

External links
Fayette County man shows gratitude to home region
Brother Eberly '39 Extends the Helping Hand
The Histories of Penn State

Eberly College of Science alumni
American energy industry businesspeople
American chief executives
1918 births
2004 deaths
20th-century American businesspeople
20th-century philanthropists